AsiaSat 4 was a Hong Kong communications satellite, which was owned, and was initially operated, by the Hong Kong based Asia Satellite Telecommunications Company (AsiaSat). It was positioned in geostationary orbit at a longitude of 122° East of the Greenwich Meridian. It spent most of its operational life at 122° East, from where it was used to provide fixed satellite services, including broadcasting, audio and data transmission, to Asia and the Pacific Ocean.

Satellite description 
AsiaSat 4 was built by Hughes Space and Communications, for US$220 million, which by the time of its launch had become part of Boeing Satellite Systems. It is based on the HS-601HP satellite bus. It carries twenty eight C-band and twenty Ku-band transponders. It was planned for late 1999, but was delayed because of the Asian crisis. Construction started in September 2000.

Launch 
The launch of AsiaSat 4 was launched by an Atlas 3B SEC launch vehicle with a Centaur upper stage. The launch was conducted from Cape Canaveral Air Force Station (SLC-36B) at 00:47:01 UTC on 12 April 2003.

AsiaSat 4 was insured for launch and first year in orbit. The AsiaSat 4 was replaced by AsiaSat 9 in 2017.

Paksat-MM1 
AsiaSat 4 in February 2018, was leased to PakSat International operator. It was subsequently moved to a longitude of 38.2° East, and in March 2018 it began operations for PakSat, who refer to it as Paksat-MM1 (Paksat-Multi Mission 1).

See also 

 Paksat-1
 Paksat-1R
 AsiaSat 9

References 

Spacecraft launched in 2003
AsiaSat satellites